The Richardiidae are a family of Diptera in the superfamily Tephritoidea.

This  small family consists of just over 30 genera and 175 species. Almost all species are neotropical. Generally, the biology of the richardiids is little known. Some of the larvae are plant feeders or saprophages in decaying plant material. One species, the pineapple fruit fly Melanoloma viatrix, has been reported as a pest of pineapples. Most adults have some general features, conspicuously pictured wings, often with metallic blue or greenish colors on the body and legs, and a typical tephritoid ovipositor.

Genera
Acompha Hendel, 1911
Antineuromyia Hendel, 1914
Automola Loew, 1873
Batrachophthalmum Hendel, 1911
Beebeomyia Curran, 1934
Cladiscophleps Enderlein, 1912
Coilometopia Macquart, 1847
Coniceps Loew, 1873
Epiplatea Loew, 1868
Euolena Loew, 1873
Hemixantha Loew, 1873
Johnrichardia Perez-Gelabert & Thompson,  2006
Macrostenomyia Hendel, 1907
Maerorichardia Hennig, 1937
Megalothoraca Hendel, 1911
Melanoloma Loew, 1873
Neoidiotypa Osten Sacken, 1878
Ocaenicia Enderlein, 1927
Odontomera Macquart, 1843
Odontomerella Hendel, 1912
Oedematella Hendel, 1911
Omomyia Coquillett, 1907
Ozaenina Enderlein, 1912
Pachysomites Cockerell, 1916
Paneryma Wulp, 1899
Poecilomyia Hendel, 1911
Richardia Robineau-Desvoidy, 1830
Richardiodes Hendel, 1912
Sepsisoma Johnson, 1900
Setellia Robineau-Desvoidy, 1830
Setellida Hendel, 1911
Spheneuolena Hendel, 1911
Stenomyites Cockerell, 1915
Urortalis <small>Cockerell, 1917

References

Steyskal, G. C. 1987. 67. Richardiidae. Manual of Nearctic Diptera 2:833-837.

External links

TOL
BugGuide Images

Brachycera families
Tephritoidea